Symplocos henschelii grows as a tree up to  tall, with a trunk diameter of up to . Bark is grey to brown. Its fragrant flowers feature a white corolla. S. henschelii is found in Burma, Thailand, Malaysia, Indonesia and the Philippines.

References

henschelii
Trees of Indo-China
Trees of Malesia
Plants described in 1848